This is a list of defunct Canadian companies.

Defunct companies, including acquired and merged ones

Note: many of these companies are still operating under the same name; they are just owned by others.

 Abitibi Power and Paper Company - now forms part of Abitibi-Consolidated
 Agricore - merged with United Grain Growers Ltd. to form Agricore United
 Aikenhead's Hardware - hardware store, acquired by Home Depot
 AMC Theatres Canada - some locations acquired by Cineplex Entertainment, others closed
 Bricklin Automobile
 Bytown and Prescott Railway - acquired by Canadian Pacific Railway
 Canada Wire and Cable - manufacturer, acquired by Alcatel
 Carling O'Keefe - brewery, acquired by Molson
 Chapters-  acquired by Indigo Books and Music
 Cineplex Odeon - acquired by Loews Theatres
 Consumers Distributing - catalogue retail store chain
 CTV (Canadian Television) - acquired by Bell Globemedia; formerly Baton Broadcasting, et al
 Diemaco - firearm and defense company; acquired by Colt's Manufacturing Company
 Dow Breweries
 Dylex - acquired by Hardof Wolf Group
 E. B. Eddy Company - acquired by Domtar
 Eaton's - Department store chain - bankrupt in 1999
 Future Shop - acquired by Best Buy
Honest Ed's - a discount retail store
 Jetsgo
 Job Brothers & Co., Limited
 John Inglis and Company - kitchen appliance maker
 McLaughlin Motor Car Co. - merged with General Motors
Noranda - merged with Falconbridge
 Nova Scotia Light and Power Company, Limited - acquired by the Province of Nova Scotia; assets leased to * Nova Scotia Power Corporation
 Ontario Malleable Iron Company - iron foundry
 PetroKazakhstan - acquired by China National Petroleum Corporation
 Polymer Corporation - sold to NOVA Corp and then Bayer AG
 Radio Shack (Canadian division) - electronics store
 Seagram - spirits and wine
 Target Canada - closed because of a $2.1 billion loss for Target Corporation
 Terra Transport
 Towers Department Stores - department store chain; acquired by Zellers
 Union Bank of Halifax - now part of the Royal Bank of Canada
 United Grain Growers Ltd. - merged with Agricore to form Agricore United
 Vidéotron - cable; now owned by Quebecor
 Woodward's - acquired by Hudson's Bay Company
 Woolco (Canadian division) - department store chain; acquired by Wal-Mart Canada
 Zellers (Canadian division) - department store chain; acquired by now defunct chain Target Canada

Aerospace 
 Avro Canada - airplane manufacturer, maker of the Avro Arrow and the Avro Aerocar.
 Canadair - acquired by Bombardier
 de Havilland Canada - acquired by Boeing and a few years later acquired by Bombardier
 Spar Aerospace - split up and acquired by MacDonald Dettwiler, L-3 Communications and Bombardier

Airlines 
 Air Atlantic
 Air BC - merged with Air Canada Jazz
 Air Ontario - merged with Air Canada Jazz
 AllCanada Express
 Austin Airways - acquired by Air Ontario
 Canada 3000 - folded, discount airline
 Canadian Airlines - acquired by Air Canada
 Canadian Pacific Airlines - acquired by Canadian Airlines
 Canadian Regional Airlines - merged with Air Canada Jazz
 Eastern Provincial Airways - acquired by Canadian Pacific Airlines
 Globemaster Air Cargo
 Great Lakes Airlines (Canada) - acquired by Air Ontario
 Greyhound Air
 Harmony Airways
 Inter-Canadien
 Jetsgo
 Lamb Air
 Maestro
 Nationair
 Nolisair
 NorOntair
 North Canada Air - acquired by Time Air
 Pacific Western Airlines
 Peace Air
 Quebecair Express
 Queen Charlotte Airlines - acquired by Pacific Western Airlines
 QuikAir
 Roots Air
 Royal Aviation - acquired by Canada 3000
 Sonicblue Airways
 Southern Frontier Airlines - acquired by Time Air
 Time Air - acquired by Air Canada Jazz
 Trans-Provincial Airlines - acquired by Harbour Air
 Triton Airlines
 Val Air
 Vision Airways Corporation
 Vistajet
 WardAir - acquired by Canadian Airlines
 Winnport
 World-Wide Airways
 Zip - merged with Air Canada
 Zoom Airlines

Banking, finance and insurance 
 Bank of America Canada - subsidiary of the United States-based bank chain Bank of America
 Bank of British Columbia (1862) - acquired by Canadian Commercial Bank
 Bank of British Columbia (1978) - acquired by HSBC Bank Canada
 Bank of British North America - acquired by Bank of Montreal
 Bank of Hamilton - acquired by Canadian Imperial Bank of Commerce
 Bank of New Brunswick - acquired by Bank of Nova Scotia
 Bank of Upper Canada
 Canada Trust - acquired by Toronto-Dominion Bank
 Canadian Commercial Bank
 City Bank 
 Consolidated Bank of Canada
 Continental Bank of Canada - acquired by Lloyds Bank of Canada
 Home Bank of Canada - failed in 1923
 Lloyds Bank of Canada - acquired by HSBC Bank Canada
 Maritime Life - acquired by Manulife Financial
 Royal Trust - acquired by Royal Bank of Canada

BioTech, Medical 
DVS Sciences - Acquired by Fluidigm (2014) and changed their name to Standard BioTools (2022)

Computer hardware and software 
 AliasWavefront - developers of industry leading Maya 3D software; in 2006 it was bought out by Autodesk Inc.
 ATI Technologies - bought out by AMD
 Ferranti-Packard - early mainframe systems
 HCR Corporation – early Unix company, acquired by Santa Cruz Operation, later closed
 I. P. Sharp Associates - time share company
 Imanet - international trade software 
 Sitebrand – online marketing company
 Watcom International Corporation - acquired by Sybase

Consumer retail, including grocery 
 Aeropostale Canada - subsidiary of the United States-based retailer Aeropostale, closed all 41 stores in Canada in 2016
A&A Records - founded in Toronto at the end of WWII, it was the dominant record chain store in Canada until being superseded by Sam the Record Man in the 1960s; it became defunct in 1993
A&B Sound - home electronics retailer based in Richmond, BC; founded in 1959, it had expanded as far as Winnipeg, Manitoba by 2000, but its subsequent decline saw the company go bankrupt by 2008
 Bata Shoes - shoe retailer and manufacturer 
 Beaver Lumber - hardware/lumber store chain; acquired by Home Hardware
 Big Lots Canada
 Dominion - grocery store chain
 Bi-Way - discount store chain
 Eaton's - bankrupt, assets acquired by Sears Canada
 Express - subsidiary of the United States-based clothing retailer Express, closed all 17 stores in Canada in 2017
 Food City - grocery store chain
 Granada TV Rental- electronic consumer goods retail rental outlets
 Hard Rock Cafe -all Canadian Cafe locations closed by 2017 but Hard Rock Casino still exist in Coquitlam, BC, Vancouver, BC, and a new location is set to open in Ottawa in 2021 Hard Rock Cafe still has a location in Niagara Falls, Ontario in Canada. 
 HMV Canada - entertainment media chain owned by Hilco; originally a subsidiary of England-based retailer HMV; closed all stores in April 2017, the majority of locations became Sunrise Records
 Kmart Canada - subsidiary of US chain, some assets acquired by Zellers
 Knob Hill Farms - grocery store chain
 Kresge (Canadian division) - discount store chain
 Lumberland Building Materials (BC-based store founded in Surrey; it merged with Revy Home Centres in 1997, which then was acquired by Rona in 2001)
 LW Stores - discount store chain; acquired by Big Lots in 2010 and closed all stores in 2014 
 Marks & Spencer - major British retailer; had operated in Canada since 1973; closed all Canadian operations by 1999
 Miracle Mart - discount store owned by the Steinberg family
 Miracle Food Mart - grocery store chain
 Morgan's - department store chain
 Pascal - bankrupt in 1991 (Hardware Stores) - 1994 (furniture stores) - 2008 (Pascal Hotel Supplies)
 RadioShack Canada - renamed The Source by Circuit City in 2005
Revelstoke Home Centres Ltd. (aka Revy's or Revy Home Centres; owned by the West Fraser Timber Company, this was a major home improvement retailer headquartered in Revelstoke, BC; merged with Rona in 2001)
 Sam The Record Man - record/entertainment media stores
 Sam's Club Canada - warehouse store chain and the subsidiary of Walmart Canada; closed in 2009
 Sears Canada - department store chain and the Canadian subsidiary of the American-based Sears, all stores closed in January 2018
 Shoprite Catalogue order store, went bankrupt in 1970's.
 Simpsons - department store chain (AKA Simpson's Sears and Sears Roebuck)
 Steinberg's - grocery store chain
 Target Canada - Canadian subsidiary of the American-based department store chain Target Corporation, closed all stores in 2015
 Thrifty's - denim/clothing store
 Towers - department store chain
 Toy City - a toy store chain, a subsidiary of Consumers Distributing
 Woodward's - department store chain
 Woolco - discount department store, acquired by Wal-Mart providing an expansion route into the Canadian market
 Zellers - discount department store; store properties bought by Target Corporation and most converted into Target Canada stores

Food and beverage 
 Mitchell's Gourmet Foods - acquired by Maple Leaf Foods
 Mother's Pizza (Chain is in the process of being revived)

Mining and energy 
 Bre-X - gold mining company, collapsed in fraud
 Dominion Steel and Coal Corporation
 Eldorado Resources - uranium mining, merged with Saskatchewan Mining Development Corporation to form Cameco (1988)
 Gulf Canada Resources - acquired by Conoco
 Hudson Bay Mining and Smelting Co. - mining
 Lightstream Resources Ltd. - oil and gas (dissolved under corporate legislation)
 Noranda - mining, merged with Falconbridge Ltd. (2005)
 Saskatchewan Mining Development Corporation (SMDC) - uranium mining, merged with Eldorado Mining and Refining Limited to form Cameco (1988)
 Teck Cominco - mining
 Westcoast Energy - acquired by Duke Energy
 West Kootenay Power & Light - acquired by Fortis Inc

Railways, commuter rail and steamship companies 

A-B
 Algoma Central and Hudson Bay Railway
 Algoma Central Railway - acquired by Canadian National Railways (CN)
 BC Rail - now part of CN
 Belt Line Railway - acquired by CN

C-E
 Canada Atlantic Railway
 Canada Eastern Railway
 Canada Southern Railway
 Canadian Government Railways
 Canadian Northern Pacific Railway
 Canadian Northern Railway
 Champlain and St. Lawrence Railroad
 Columbia and Kootenay Railway
 Devco Railway
 Dominion Atlantic Railway

E-G
 European and North American Railway
 Grand River Railway - acquired by Canadian Pacific
 Grand Trunk Pacific Railway - acquired by CN
 Great Western Railway

H-K
 Halifax and Southwestern Railway
 Huntsville and Lake of Bays Transportation Company - steamship and railway
 Intercolonial Railway of Canada
 International Railway
 Kaslo and Slocan Railway
 Kettle Valley Railway

M-N
 Metropolitan Street Railway of Toronto
 Midland Railway of Canada
 Nakusp and Slocan Railway
 National Transcontinental Railway
 Nelson and Fort Sheppard Railway
 New Brunswick Railway
 Newfoundland Railway
 Northern Alberta Railways
 Northern Railway of Canada
 Nosbonsing and Nipissing Railway
 Nova Scotia Railway

O-P
 Ontario and Quebec Railway
 Ottawa, Arnprior & Parry Sound Railway
 Parry Sound Colonization Railway
 Port Arthur, Duluth and Western Railway
 Prince Edward Island Railway

S-T
Sydney and Louisburg Railway
Toronto, Hamilton and Buffalo Railway
Toronto and Mimico Electric Railway and Light Company
Toronto and Scarboro' Electric Railway, Light and Power Company
Toronto and York Radial Railway
Toronto Suburban Railway

Telecommunications companies 
Nortel - established in 1895; in 2000 accounted for more than a third of the total valuation of all the companies listed on the Toronto Stock Exchange (TSX)

See also
 List of defunct hotels in Canada

References

 
Defunct
Canada

fr:Liste des entreprises canadiennes